The Lamp is a 2011 American drama film directed by Tracy Trost.

Plot
In what seems to be the final days of their already strained marriage, Stanley and Lisa Walters (Jason London and Meredith Salenger) are presented with a strange gift – an old oil lamp. Along with the lamp comes a mysterious messenger (Louis Gossett Jr) and a statement that will cause them to search the depths of their hearts to find its truth.

Cast
Jason London as Stanley Walters
Meredith Salenger as Lisa Walters
Louis Gossett Jr. as Charles Montgomery III
Sarah Joy Brown as Deb
Muse Watson as Sam
L. Scott Caldwell as Miss Esther
Cameron Ten Napel as Josh
Georgia Cole as Alex
Katie Burgess as Rachel
Greyson Moore as Eddy Walters
Reed Williams as Austin
Darrell Alan Cole as Cody
Chuck Browne as Deb's Husband
Roger Nix as Minister
Derek Jackson as Tigers' Coach
Cooper the Dog as himself

Distribution 
Exploration Films signed a distribution agreement with Trost Moving Pictures in 2018. Exploration Films manages worldwide distribution for The Lamp.

References

External links

The Lamp on Dove.org
The Lamp on Rotten Tomatoes

2010s American films
2010s English-language films
2011 drama films
2011 films
American drama films
Films shot in Oklahoma